A penem is a type of β-lactam with an unsaturated five-member heterocycle containing a sulfur atom fused to the β-lactam ring. Penems do not occur naturally; all are synthetic. Related to penems are carbapenems, which have a carbon atom in place of the sulfur atom.

An example is faropenem.

Structure

Penem molecules do not occur naturally, and production of penems is an entirely synthetic process.

Five main penem subgroups — thiopenems, oxypenems, aminopenems, alkylpenems, and arylpenems — have been produced and are distinguished by the side chain (at position 2) of the unsaturated five-membered ring. One structurally distinct penem is BRL 42715. This molecule has no substitution at the above position, but has a bulky group attached to the β-lactam ring, and it displays effective inhibition of class C β-lactamases, but no antimicrobial activity.

One possible consequence of these structural differences of penems from other β-lactams may be reduced immunogenicity and immunogenic cross-reactivity.

References

Further reading
 

Beta-lactam antibiotics